The Bridge of Masegoso (Spanish: Puente de Masegoso) is a Roman bridge located in Pozalmuro, Spain. It was declared Bien de Interés Cultural in 2001.

References 

Bien de Interés Cultural landmarks in the Province of Soria
Bridges in Castile and León